Bostra fascialis is a species of snout moth in the genus Bostra. It was described by Warren in 1895. It is found in India (it was described from the Khasia Hills).

References

Pyralini
Moths described in 1895
Moths of Asia